Always in My Heart may refer to:

Albums
Siempre en Mi Corazón—Always in My Heart, a 1983 album by Plácido Domingo
Always in My Heart, a 1987 album by Ray Conniff
Always In My Heart, a 2001 album by R.W. Hampton

Songs
"Always in My Heart" (1942 song), a song by Bobby Vinton from the album Roses Are Red
"Always in My Heart" (Tevin Campbell song), from the 1994 album I'm Ready
"Always in My Heart", a track by Bob Seger & The Silver Bullet Band from the 1991 album The Fire Inside
"Siempre en Mi Corazón" ("Always in My Heart"), a song from the 1942 film Always in My Heart

Films
Always in My Heart (film), a 1942 film directed by Jo Graham